The 1983–84 DePaul Blue Demons men's basketball team represented DePaul University during the 1983–84 NCAA Division I men's basketball season. They were led by head coach Ray Meyer, in his 42nd and final season at the school, and played their home games at the Rosemont Horizon in Rosemont.

After opening the season with a No. 18 ranking in the AP poll, the Blue Demons won their first 16 games – including victories over No. 3 Georgetown, No. 7 Purdue, and at No. 15 UCLA – to vault to No. 2. DePaul received a bid to the 1984 NCAA Tournament as the No. 1 seed in the Midwest region. In the second round, DePaul beat Illinois State to advance to the Sweet Sixteen where they were upset by Wake Forest in overtime, 73–71. The Blue Demons finished the season 27–3 and ranked No. 4 in both major polls.

Roster

Schedule and results

|-
!colspan=9 style=| Regular season

|-
!colspan=12 style=| NCAA Tournament

Source:

Rankings

References 

DePaul Blue Demons men's basketball seasons
DePaul
1983 in sports in Illinois
1984 in sports in Illinois
DePaul